State Route 208 (SR-208) is a , north–south state highway on the Uintah and Ouray Indian Reservation in the Uinta Basin in eastern Duchesne County, Utah, United States, that connects U.S. Route 40 (US-40) with Utah State Route 35 (SR-35).

Route description
SR-208 runs through a very rural area as a two-lane road, not passing near any communities and not intersecting with any significant side roads along its course.

(From the intersection, US-40 heads east toward Duchesne, Roosevelt, and Vernal and west toward Heber City, Provo, and Salt Lake City. Hatch Knife Road [39300 West] heads southerly from the intersection as a dirt road into the foothills of Cedar Mountain.)

From its southern terminus, SR-208 heads north–northeast for about  before reaching a T intersection with 4 C's Ranch Road (the only named side road along the highway), connecting with several unnamed side dirt roads along the way. (4 C's Ranch Road heads southeasterly into the 4 C's Ranch.) After continuing north–northeast for about another mile (1.6 km) and just after going over a very low mountain pass, SR-208 curves slightly west. The highway then continues on a nearly northward course for about another mile (1.6 km) as it crosses the Santaquin Draw. For the next  the highway traverses a series of gradual curves through the lowest of the southeast foothills of Tabby Mountain.

At the mouth of that canyon, SR-208 crosses the Duchesne River as it curves to head north for its last half mile (0.8 km). (SR-35 heads southeasterly to its own [eastern] terminus at Utah State Route 87, which in turn, proceeds south to Duchesne. SR-35 heads northwesterly to Tabiona, Hanna, Heber City, and Park City.)

Legal definition
The legal definition of State Route 208 is as follows:
 72-4-126. State highways -- SR-201 to SR-204, SR-208 to SR-211.
 (5) SR-208. From Route 40 east of Fruitland northerly to Route 35 near Tabiona.

Traffic

The Utah Department of Transportation (UDOT) collects data for the State Highways and Local Federal-Aid roads. Traffic is measured in both directions and reported Annual Average Daily Traffic (AADT). AADT is collected for major intersections and "sections where traffic volumes show a substantial increase or decrease". Reported traffic data for the entire length of SR-208. , SR-208 had an AADT of 424. Since 1981, traffic along the highway has increased by nearly 93 percent.

Travel restrictions along SR-208 only apply to oversized vehicles and are the same as those which UDOT has established that apply to all state highways in within the state.

History
SR-208 was designated in 1941 by the Utah State Road Commission as running "from a point on route 6 [US-40] approximately six miles east of Fruitland in Duchesne County, thence northerly to route 35 at a point near Tabiona". The route has remained unchanged since then.

Major intersections

See also

 List of state highways in Utah

Notes

References

External links

 Highway Reference Information: 0208P (PDF)
 Route 208 on Dan Stober's Utah Highways (as archived by the Wayback Machine)

208
 208